This is a list of geometry topics.

Types, methodologies, and terminologies of geometry. 
 Absolute geometry
 Affine geometry
 Algebraic geometry
 Analytic geometry
 Archimedes' use of infinitesimals
 Birational geometry
 Complex geometry
 Combinatorial geometry
 Computational geometry
 Conformal geometry
 Constructive solid geometry
 Contact geometry
 Convex geometry
 Descriptive geometry
 Differential geometry
 Digital geometry
 Discrete geometry
 Distance geometry
 Elliptic geometry
 Enumerative geometry
 Epipolar geometry
 Finite geometry
 Fractal geometry
 Geometry of numbers
 Hyperbolic geometry
 Incidence geometry
 Information geometry
 Integral geometry
 Inversive geometry
 Inversive ring geometry
 Klein geometry
 Lie sphere geometry
 Non-Euclidean geometry
 Noncommutative algebraic geometry
 Noncommutative geometry
 Numerical geometry
 Ordered geometry
 Parabolic geometry
 Plane geometry
 Projective geometry
 Quantum geometry
 Riemannian geometry
 Ruppeiner geometry
 Spherical geometry
 Symplectic geometry
 Synthetic geometry
 Systolic geometry
 Taxicab geometry
 Toric geometry
 Transformation geometry
 Tropical geometry

Euclidean geometry foundations 

 Hilbert's axioms
 Point
 Locus
 Line
 Parallel
 Angle
 Concurrent lines
 Adjacent angles
 Central angle
 Complementary angles
 Inscribed angle
 Internal angle
 Supplementary angles
 Angle trisection
 Congruence
 Reflection
 Rotation
 Coordinate rotations and reflections
 Translation
 Glide reflection
 Similarity
 Similarity transformation
 Homothety
 Shear mapping

Euclidean plane geometry 

 2D computer graphics
 2D geometric model
 Altitude
 Brahmagupta's formula
 Bretschneider's formula
 Compass and straightedge constructions
 Squaring the circle
 Complex geometry
 Conic section
 Focus
 Circle
 List of circle topics
 Thales' theorem
 Circumcircle
 Concyclic
 Incircle and excircles of a triangle
 Orthocentric system
 Monge's theorem
 Power center
 Nine-point circle
 Circle points segments proof
 Mrs. Miniver's problem
 Isoperimetric theorem
 Annulus
 Ptolemaios' theorem
 Steiner chain
 Eccentricity
 Ellipse
 Semi-major axis
 Hyperbola
 Parabola
 Matrix representation of conic sections
 Dandelin spheres
 Curve of constant width
 Reuleaux triangle
 Frieze group
 Golden angle
 Holditch's theorem
 Interactive geometry software
 Involutes
 Goat grazing problem
 Parallel postulate
 Polygon
 Star polygon
 Pick's theorem
 Shape dissection
 Bolyai–Gerwien theorem
 Poncelet–Steiner theorem
 Polygon triangulation
 Pons asinorum
 Quadrilateral
 Bicentric quadrilateral
 Cyclic quadrilateral
 Equidiagonal quadrilateral
 Kite (geometry)
 Orthodiagonal quadrilateral
 Rhombus
Rectangle
Square
 Tangential quadrilateral
Trapezoid
Isosceles trapezoid
 Sangaku
 Straightedge
 Symmedian
 Tessellation
 Prototile
 Aperiodic tiling
 Wang tile
 Penrose tiling
 Trapezoid (trapezium)
 Isosceles trapezoid
 Triangle
 Acute and obtuse triangles
 Equilateral triangle
 Euler's line
 Heron's formula
 Integer triangle
Heronian triangle
 Isosceles triangle
 List of triangle inequalities
 List of triangle topics
 Pedal triangle
 Pedoe's inequality
 Pythagorean theorem
 Pythagorean triangle
 Right triangle
 Triangle inequality
 Trigonometry
 List of trigonometry topics
 Wallpaper group

3-dimensional Euclidean geometry

 3D projection
 3D computer graphics
 Binary space partitioning
 Ray tracing
 Graham scan
 Borromean rings
 Cavalieri's principle
 Cross section
 Crystal
 Cuisenaire rods
 Desargues' theorem
 Right circular cone
 Hyperboloid
 Napkin ring problem
 Pappus's centroid theorem
 Paraboloid
 Polyhedron
 Defect
 Dihedral angle
 Prism
 Prismatoid
 Honeycomb
 Pyramid
 Parallelepiped
 Tetrahedron
 Heronian tetrahedron
 Platonic solid
 Archimedean solid
 Kepler-Poinsot polyhedra
 Johnson solid
 Uniform polyhedron
 Polyhedral compound
 Hilbert's third problem
 Deltahedron
 Surface normal
 3-sphere, spheroid, ellipsoid
 Parabolic microphone
 Parabolic reflector
 Soddy's hexlet
 Sphericon
 Stereographic projection
 Stereometry

n-dimensional Euclidean geometry 
 Ball
 Convex
 Convex hull
 Coxeter group
 Euclidean distance
 Homothetic center
 Hyperplane
 Lattice
 Ehrhart polynomial
 Leech lattice
 Minkowski's theorem
 Packing
 Sphere packing
 Kepler conjecture
 Kissing number problem
 Honeycomb
 Andreini tessellation
 Uniform tessellation
 Voronoi tessellation
 Delaunay triangulation
 Quasicrystal
 Parallelogram law
 Polytope
 Schläfli symbol
 Regular polytope
 Regular Polytopes
 Sphere
 Quadric
 Hypersphere, sphere
 Spheroid
 Ellipsoid
 Hyperboloid
 Paraboloid
 Cone
 Torus
 Root system
 Similarity
 Zonotope

Other geometries (not Euclidean)

 Projective geometry
 Arc (projective geometry)
 Desargues' theorem
 Girard Desargues
 Desarguesian plane
 Line at infinity
 Point at infinity
 Plane at infinity
 Hyperplane at infinity
 Projective line
 Projective plane
 Oval (projective plane)
 Roman surface
 Projective space
 Complex projective line
 Complex projective plane
 Fundamental theorem of projective geometry
 Projective transformation
 Möbius transformation
 Cross-ratio
 Duality
 Homogeneous coordinates
 Pappus's hexagon theorem
 Incidence
 Pascal's theorem
 Affine geometry
 Affine space
 Affine transformation
 Finite geometry
 Differential geometry
 Contact geometry
 Riemannian geometry
 Symplectic geometry
 Non-Euclidean plane geometry
 Angle excess
 Hyperbolic geometry
 Pseudosphere
 Tractricoid
 Elliptic geometry
 Spherical geometry
 Minkowski space
 Thurston's conjecture

Numerical geometry 
 Parametric curve
 Bézier curve
 Spline
 Hermite spline
 B-spline
 NURBS
 Parametric surface

Geometric algorithms
 Convex hull construction
 Euclidean shortest path
 Point in polygon
 Point location
 Hidden line removal

Mathematical morphology

 Minkowski addition

Generalizations
 Noncommutative geometry
 Topology

Various 
 Coordinate-free treatment
 Chirality
 Handedness
 Relative direction
 Mirror image
 Erlangen program
 Four-dimensional space
 Geometric shape
 Geometric space
 Group action, invariant
 Hadwiger's theorem
 Infinitesimal transformation
 Pi
 Polar sine
 Symmetry, shape, pattern
 Crystal system
 Frieze group
 Isometry
 Lattice
 Point group
 Point groups in two dimensions
 Point groups in three dimensions
 Space group
 Symmetry group
 Translational symmetry
 Wallpaper group
 Mathematics and fiber arts
 Van Hiele model - Prevailing theory of how children learn to reason in geometry

Applications 
 Astronomy
 Computer graphics
 Image analysis
 Robot control
 The Strähle construction is used in the design of some musical instruments.
 Burmester's theory for the design of mechanical linkages

See also
 Mathematics

Geometry
 
Geometry

he:גאומטריה#מונחים